Feisthamel-Edelberg Cottage is a historic cure cottage located at Saranac Lake in the town of Harrietstown, Franklin County, New York.  It was built about 1915 and is a -story, three- by five-bay frame dwelling clad in wood shingles.  It sits on a brick and concrete foundation and has a cross-gable roof.  It features a 2-story cure porch with Colonial Revival style details.

It was listed on the National Register of Historic Places in 1992.

References

Houses on the National Register of Historic Places in New York (state)
Colonial Revival architecture in New York (state)
Houses completed in 1915
Houses in Franklin County, New York
National Register of Historic Places in Franklin County, New York